Bob Skoronski (born Robert Francis Skowronski; March 5, 1934 – October 30, 2018) was an American football player who played tackle in the National Football League for the Green Bay Packers for 11 seasons.

Early years
Born in Ansonia, Connecticut, Skoronski grew up in Derby with three brothers and a sister.  He went to high school at Fairfield College Preparatory School, graduating in 1951. He then attended Admiral Billard Academy in New London for a year. He played college football at Indiana University in Bloomington. As a senior in 1955, he was the Hoosiers' most valuable player and averaged 50 minutes per game.

Playing career
Skoronski was selected in the fifth round of the 1956 NFL draft, 56th overall, by the Green Bay Packers. He started at left tackle in his rookie season in 1956 under third-year head coach Lisle Blackbourn, and then served two years in the U.S. Air Force. Skoronski returned to the team in 1959, the first season under head coach Vince Lombardi.

Skoronski was the offensive left tackle and offensive captain on Lombardi's five NFL championship teams. He played in the Pro Bowl following the 1966 season (and the first Super Bowl).

Following his 11th season in the NFL, Skoronski retired in June 1969, and was elected to the Packers Hall of Fame in 1976.

In 2017, the Professional Football Researchers Association named Skoronski to the PFRA Hall of Very Good Class of 2017.

Personal life
Skoronski met his wife Ruth in college and they married in 1956.  They had four children, three boys and a girl (Bob, Steve, Ron and Patti), and four grandchildren. He died of Alzheimer's disease on October 30, 2018, in Middleton, Wisconsin. A grandson, Peter Skoronski, played offensive tackle at Northwestern University.

References

External links
 
 National Polish-American Sports Hall of Fame – Bob Skoronski

1934 births
2018 deaths
American football offensive linemen
Indiana Hoosiers football players
Green Bay Packers players
People from Ansonia, Connecticut
Western Conference Pro Bowl players
Players of American football from Connecticut
American people of Polish descent
Fairfield College Preparatory School alumni